James Earl Wall (December 12, 1917October 27, 2010) was an American stage manager and actor.

Having performed on radio, theater, and in the Army during World War II, Wall worked as a stage manager on Broadway before being hired as the stage manager for the children's television series Captain Kangaroo by CBS in 1962.  In an interview clip that aired on the October 28, 2010, CBS Evening News, Wall recalled how he made the case to Kangaroos producers for an African-American character.  However, he still had to audition for the role which became Mr. Baxter', a teacher and Captain Kangaroo's neighbor.  Wall joined the cast in 1968, remaining with the show until 1979; he made a guest appearance in 1981. He was also the stage manager for 41 consecutive years on the US Open Tennis Championships telecasts.

Wall was presented with the Directors Guild of America's Franklin J. Schaffner Achievement Award in 1994. He continued to work for CBS in semi-retirement until 2009.

References

External links
 

1917 births
2010 deaths
Actors from Wilmington, North Carolina
Male actors from North Carolina
United States Army personnel of World War II
African-American male actors
African-American radio personalities
American male television actors
20th-century African-American people
21st-century African-American people